Colt 1908 may refer to:
 Colt Model 1908 Pocket Hammerless, a variant of the Colt Model 1903 Pocket Hammerless
 Colt Model 1908 Vest Pocket